TERNAC is an emulation written in FORTRAN of a ternary computer on another binary machine, a Burroughs B1700. It was implemented in 1973 at State University of New York, Buffalo (SUNY Buffalo).  The implementation provided both fixed-point and floating-point capability; fixed-point words were 24 trits in length and the floating-point words had 42 trits for mantissa and 6 trits for exponent.

TERNAC was intended primarily to discover if the implementation of a nonbinary structure on a binary computer was feasible, and to ascertain the cost in memory storage and time for such an implementation. As a feasibility test, it was successful, and proved that both speed and price are comparable with that of binary computers.

See also
Setun (ternary computer constructed in USSR)

References
^ DSSP & Forth : Compare And Analysis
G. Frieder, A. Fong, and C. Y. Chao. A Balanced Ternary Computer. Department of Computer Science, State University of New York at Buffalo, pages 68–88, 1972
Ternary computers: part I: motivation for ternary computers 	G. Frieder, 1972; Proceeding MICRO 5 Conference
Ternary computers: part 2: emulation of a ternary computer G. Frieder, 1972; Proceeding MICRO 5 Conference

External links
Development of ternary computers at Moscow State University
Nikolai Brusentsov's Setun entry
Pioneers of Soviet Computing

Mainframe computers
Ternary computers

de:Setun
pl:Setun (komputer)